Too B or Not Too B is the second compilation album by Australian alternative rock band Kisschasy, which reached the ARIA Albums Chart. It was released as their second compilation after their Japan-only release Fire in the Breeze in 2004, and directly after their 2007 Live at the Playroom EP, on 10 May 2008. The album contains a total of 16 tracks, taken from a mix of B-sides, songs from their 2004 EPs Darkside / Stay Awake and Cara Sposa and previously unreleased songs.

Track listing

CD 
 "Darkside" (Darkside / Stay Awake) – 3:03
 "Stay Awake" (Darkside / Stay Awake) – 3:07
 "Anger is the Brand New Thing" (Darkside / Stay Awake) – 3:08
 "Reminder" (Cara Sposa) – 3:04
 "Love Affair with Distance" (Cara Sposa) – 3:20
 "One Mistake" (Cara Sposa) – 3:18
 "The Way They Walk" (Cara Sposa) – 3:27
 "Resolution Wednesday" ("Do-Do's & Whoa-Oh's") – 2:52
 "Doomsday" ("Do-Do's & Whoa-Oh's") – 3:30
 "Hey Jealousy" (Gin Blossoms cover) ("Do-Do's & Whoa-Oh's") – 3:46
 "It's Getting Easier to Die" ("The Shake") – 4:05
 "The Boat" ("The Shake") – 3:26
 "Electric in the Chair" (Previously unreleased) – 3:16
 "Jack the Alien" (Previously unreleased) – 2:58
 "Wake. Sleep. Turn. Repeat." (Previously unreleased) – 2:28
 "Darkside" (acoustic) (Darkside / Stay Awake) – 3:40

DVD 
 "Do-Do's & Whoa-Oh's" (music video) – 3:32
 "Face Without a Name" (music video) – 3:06
 "The Shake" (music video) – 4:02
 "This Bed" (music video) – 4:10
 "Opinions Won't Keep You Warm at Night" (music video) – 3:06
 "Spray on Pants" (music video) – 3:47
 "Strings and Drums" (music video) – 3:12

Charts

References 

2008 compilation albums
Compilation albums by Australian artists
2008 video albums
Kisschasy albums
Music video compilation albums